The FIL European Luge Championships 1994 took place in Königssee, Germany for a record sixth time after hosting the event previously in 1967, 1972, 1973, 1977, and 1988.

Men's singles

Women's singles

Men's doubles

Mixed team

Medal table

References
Men's doubles European champions
Men's singles European champions
Mixed teams European champions
Women's singles European champions

FIL European Luge Championships
1994 in luge
Luge in Germany
1994 in German sport